The Arista was a French automobile which took its name from its founder, one P. Arista-Ruffier; the marque was manufactured by the Établissements Ruffier in Paris from 1912 to 1915.  Eight models were introduced in the first year of production.  These were a 720 cc single cylinder cycle car, fours of 1460cc, 1726 cc, and 1847 cc which featured friction drive and were sold complete with bodywork and tires, and fours of 1460 cc, 1593 cc, 1847 cc, and 2001 cc with conventional gearboxes; these last were sold as untired chassis.

References

Literature
 Georgano, G. N. (editor): Complete Encyclopedia of Motorcars, 1885 to the Present; Dutton Press, New York, 2nd ed. (Hardcover) 1973, 

Brass Era vehicles
Defunct motor vehicle manufacturers of France